Ranko Perović (born 7 April 1968) is a Montenegrin water polo player and coach. He competed in the men's tournament at the 1996 Summer Olympics.

References

External links
 

1968 births
Living people
Place of birth missing (living people)
Serbia and Montenegro male water polo players
Montenegrin male water polo players
Olympic water polo players of Yugoslavia
Water polo players at the 1996 Summer Olympics
Montenegrin water polo coaches
Montenegro men's national water polo team coaches
Water polo coaches at the 2012 Summer Olympics